Cecil Glen Foster (August 30, 1925 – July 5, 2016) was a veteran of the Korean War and the 23rd United States Ace: he shot down 9 Mig-15s. He was a recipient of the American Fighter Aces Congressional Gold Medal, the Distinguished Flying Cross, two Silver Stars and a Purple Heart. During the Korean War Foster flew 200 combat sorties. He was also commanded the 390th Tactical Fighter Squadron during the Vietnam War.

Education
Midland High School (graduated in 1943)
Aviation Cadet Training Program (USAAF) (1945)

Career
in 1943 Foster joined the Army Air Force and held the rank of private. He earned his wings in 1948 and resigned his commission in 1950. After two years in civilian life the Korean War began and in 1951 Foster was recalled to active duty.

He saw action in the Korean War where he shot down 9 planes which places him 12th on the list of 38 Korean War aces. During the Korean War he piloted an F-86 Sabre and he flew 200 combat sorties.

During the Vietnam War Foster was the commander of the 390th Tactical Fighter Squadron in DaNang in 1968. He retired in 1975 with the rank of lieutenant colonel.

On May 20, 2015 Foster traveled to Washington D.C. to receive the Congressional Gold Medal. He was one of 36 former combat pilots representing the American Fighter Aces Association.

In 2001 he published his memoirs entitled: MiG Alley to Mu Ghia Pass: Memoirs of a Korean War Ace.

Awards

Congressional Gold Medal (2015)
Silver Star
Purple Heart

Personal
Foster was born in Porter Township Michigan. He went to Midland High School and graduated in 1943. His mother died from polio and he moved in with his grandparents and lived on their farm. After high school he joined the Aviation Cadet Training Program (USAAF). On January 13, 1945 he married Margaret Mary Née Frazer: together they had five sons.

See also
List of Korean War flying aces

References

Bibliography

Further reading

Notes

1925 births
2016 deaths
Military personnel from Michigan
Recipients of the Silver Star
American Korean War flying aces
People from Midland County, Michigan
Recipients of the Distinguished Flying Cross (United States)
Recipients of the Air Medal
Burials at Arlington National Cemetery
Aviators from Michigan